Louis Miehe-Renard (11 April 1919 – 21 January 1997) was a Danish film actor. He appeared in 70 films between 1948 and 1988. He was born in Copenhagen, Denmark and died in Denmark.

Filmography

Det hændte i København - 1949
For frihed og ret - 1949
Kampen mod uretten - 1949
Min kone er uskyldig - 1950
Det sande ansigt - 1951
Fodboldpræsten - 1951
Nålen - 1951
Bag de røde porte - 1951
Alt dette og Island med - 1951
Familien Schmidt - 1951
Det gamle guld - 1951
To minutter for sent - 1952
Vejrhanen - 1952
Fløjtespilleren - 1953
Adam og Eva - 1953
Ved Kongelunden - 1953
The Old Mill on Mols - 1953
Himlen er blå - 1954
Sukceskomponisten - 1954
I kongens klær - 1954
Far til fire på landet - 1955
Mod og mandshjerte - 1955
Der kom en dag - 1955
På tro og love - 1955
Kristiane af Marstal - 1956
Hvad vil De ha'? - 1956
Sønnen fra Amerika - 1957
Over alle grænser - 1958
Det lille hotel - 1958
Soldaterkammerater - 1958
Lyssky transport gennem Danmark - 1958
Soldaterkammerater rykker ud - 1959
Soldaterkammerater på vagt - 1960
Tro, håb og trolddom - 1960
Frihedens pris - 1960
Flemming og Kvik - 1960
Skibet er ladet med - 1960
Soldaterkammerater på efterårsmanøvre - 1961
Flemming på kostskole - 1961
Soldaterkammerater på sjov - 1962
Den kære familie - 1962
Journey to the Seventh Planet - 1962
Fem mand og Rosa - 1964
Dyden går amok - 1966
Nu stiger den - 1966
Soldaterkammerater på bjørnetjeneste - 1968
Kyrkoherden - 1970
Pigen og drømmeslottet - 1974

External links

1919 births
1997 deaths
Danish male film actors
Male actors from Copenhagen
20th-century Danish male actors